Edogawa Maru (Kanji:) was a 6,968-ton Japanese Type 2A Wartime Standard cargo ship that was sunk by  on 18 November 1944 with 2,114 lives lost.

Edogawa Maru sailed as part of convoy MI-27 with seven other ships from Moji to Miri, Borneo, on 15 November 1944. Escorted by a converted minesweeper and three smaller escorts (Type D escort ship CD-134 and two s,  and CHa-157), the convoy hugged the coast of the Korean peninsula to try to avoid American submarines.  Nevertheless, a group of three submarines—, and —found and attacked the convoy on the night of 17/18 November. At 22:00 a torpedo from Sunfish struck and crippled Edogawa Maru. In the early hours of 18 November a second torpedo from Sunfish finished off Edogawa Maru. The ship had not been evacuated in the meantime and 1,998 soldiers and 116 crewmen died when the ship sunk.

The ships , Osakasan Maru, and Chinaki Maru were also sunk that night.

See also 
 List by death toll of ships sunk by submarines

References

 David L Williams (2012). In the Shadow of the Titanic: Merchant Ships Lost With Greater Fatalities The History Press

Maritime incidents in November 1944
Ships sunk by American submarines
World War II merchant ships of Japan
1944 ships
World War II shipwrecks in the East China Sea
Ships built in Japan
Troop ships of Japan
Ships of the NYK Line